A Konditorei is a business that typically offers a wide variety of pastries and typically also serves as a café.  (plural) are found in many different countries including but not limited to Germany, Austria, Switzerland, France, Denmark, Sweden, and the Czech Republic. In French-speaking countries, similar businesses are referred to as pâtisseries.

The culture and function of the Konditorei may vary based on locations. In Germany, Austria, Switzerland and several northern European countries, it is customary to consume a portion of cake with coffee or hot chocolate on the premises.

In order to become a Konditor, the speciality baker for a Konditorei, the profession (in many countries) requires an extensive apprenticeship or speciality training program.

About 
The primary focus of a Konditorei is selling pastries, which may be made in-house or brought in from another bakery. They commonly also offer a selection of coffees, soft drinks, and many may also sell alcoholic drinks. Many larger  also serve ice cream and chocolates.

Apart from its typical menu, a Konditorei chiefly differs from a restaurant in that opening hours tend to be morning and afternoon, rather than afternoon and evening.

Etymology 
A Konditorei puts emphasis on the artistic aspect of the trade and, unlike a bakery, does not produce breads. The craft developed when particular bakers specialised in the creation of sweet bread to which candied fruits and other sweet ingredients were added. The origin of the word Konditor (the Konditorei’s baker) stems from the Latin word candire, which stands for “candying of fruits”. Another derivation is the Latin word conditura (condio) = to concoct (food), preservation (of fruits).

Konditorei is the German word for a pâtisserie or confectionery shop. In Sweden, Norway and Denmark, the term konditori is used and the term konditor for a confectioner has been used since the beginning of the 18th century.

In the Czech Republic, such shops are usually called cukrárna (sugar shop) and their Polish variants are named cukiernia (same meaning).

History and development of the Konditor

Lebkuchen 
The profession of the Konditor developed from that of the baker. Once the bakers of medieval times (15th century) mastered the art of baking bread, some started to enrich the dough with honey, dried fruits and spices. These specialists called themselves Lebküchler, Lebküchner or Lebzelter. They founded a guild in 1643 in the area in and around Nürnberg, Germany. At the same time, the Lebkuchen bakers ran a second trade using wax, a side product of honey: they became chandlers, supplying churches and private households with artistic candles, wax figures and pictures made of wax. They carved wooden molds themselves and used these to pour magnificent pictures made of wax. A few Konditoreien practiced the sophisticated art of the chandlers until recent times. The Lebküchner were turned to confectioners later and finally became Konditoreien.

Sugar and spices 
The maritime trade brought spices and sugar from the Eastern world to the famous Italian harbor towns of Genoa and Venice. Although sugar had an immense appeal, only the rich were privileged to consume it. The profession of confectioner was related to that of the pharmacist because the trade with sugar was exclusive to pharmacists. The German word “Konfekt” (English: confection) to describe sweets stems from the language of the drug makers, which were also called confectionari.

Production of marzipan 
In the 14th century, the Venetians introduced marzipan, a confection made from almonds, sugar and rose water, to central Europe. Marzipan was an ideal material for moulding magnificent pictures from, which were artistically painted with plant colouring and often decorated with gold leaf.

Chocolate
At the start of the 19th century, chocolate first made its way to Germany, after the ladies of the upper classes in Spain, Italy and France had long been used to a daily cup of hot chocolate. When the Dutchman Coenraad Johannes van Houten managed to press out the cocoa mass, the additional ingredients cocoa butter and cocoa powder were created. The chocolate thinned with cocoa butter was used to pour a variety of figures, and painting cakes with cocoa powder became popular. The trade of the “Chocolatier”, a Konditor specialised in working with chocolate, was born. Chocolate now played a major role in the Konditorei. A good example is the chocolate cake created by Franz Sacher, who was the chocolate cook for Klemens von Metternich in Vienna in 1832.

Pastries 
The abundance of sugar through the native sugar beet in the 19th century lead to the development of cakes and pastries, with focus taken off decorative art. Light sponge cakes, almond pastries, apple strudel or milk-cream strudel, Gugelhupf, and cream cakes were served with then modern drinks such as coffee, tea and chocolate.

Notable konditors

Nicolas Appert, French inventor of food preservation
, Munich baker and inventor of Prinzregententorte
 Johann Zauner (1803–1868)
 Anton Gerstner 
 Christoph Demel
 Ludwig Heiner
 Louis Lehmann
 Wilhelm J. Sluka (1861–1932)
 Anton Rumpelmayer (1832–1914)
 Amaury Guichon (* 1991)
 Natalie Sideserf (* 1985)

See also
 Bakery
 Coffeehouse
 Schlagobers, Richard Strauss' ballet, set in a konditorei

References

External links

Types of coffeehouses and cafés
German words and phrases
German cuisine